Takele Nigate (born 2 October 1999) is an Ethiopian track and field athlete who specializes in the 3000 metres steeplechase. In 2019, he competed in the men's 3000 metres steeplechase at the 2019 World Athletics Championships held in Doha, Qatar. He did not qualify to compete in the final.

In 2017, he won the men's 3000 metres steeplechase at the 2017 African U20 Championships in Athletics held in Tlemcen, Algeria.

In 2018, he won the men's 3000 metres steeplechase at the 2018 IAAF World U20 Championships held in Tampere, Finland.

In 2019, he represented Ethiopia at the 2019 African Games held in Rabat, Morocco. He competed in the men's 3000 metres steeplechase and he finished in 4th place.

References

External links 
 

Living people
1999 births
Place of birth missing (living people)
Ethiopian male cross country runners
Ethiopian male steeplechase runners
World Athletics Championships athletes for Ethiopia
Athletes (track and field) at the 2019 African Games
African Games competitors for Ethiopia